This is a list of notable backup software that performs data backups. Archivers, transfer protocols, and version control systems are often used for backups but only software focused on backup is listed here. See Comparison of backup software for features.

Free and open-source software

Commercial and closed-source software

Defunct software

See also 
 Comparison of file synchronization software
 Comparison of online backup services
 Data recovery
 File synchronization
 List of data recovery software
 Remote backup service
 Tape management system

Notes

References 

Backup software